Paolo Barilla (born 20 April 1961) is a businessman and a former Formula One driver who raced for the Minardi team. He is now the Deputy Chairman of the Barilla Group and, as of January 2017, had a net worth of US$1.39 billion.

Racing career
Barilla started racing in 1975 and won the Italian 100cc karting title the following year. He entered Formula Fiat Abarth in 1980 and the next year moved up to Formula 3, in which he won some races and finished third in the Italian Championship. He then entered Formula 2 in 1982 with Minardi, but between 1983 and 1988 he concentrated in sports car racing, winning 24 Hours of Le Mans by a three-lap margin in 1985, among other victories, in the Joest Racing Porsche 956, co-driven at various times with Klaus Ludwig, Paul Belmondo, Marc Duez and Louis Krages (also known at the time as John Winter).

In 1987 Barilla returned to single-seaters and raced in the Japanese Formula 3000 Championship, before returning to Minardi in 1989 for a test. This test gave him the chance to replace Pierluigi Martini at Suzuka that year and afterwards was signed to drive for the team in 1990. Barilla wasn't quick enough to qualify regularly and was replaced before the end of the year by Gianni Morbidelli.

In 2014, Barilla won the Monaco Historic Grand Prix in the Formula 3 class driving a Chevron B34.

Barilla was featured in a 2017 documentary about the restoration of a Ferrari 312B historic Formula 1 race car.

Business career
In 1990 Barilla retired from racing and joined his family's businesses. Upon his return to the corporation, he briefly filled in as the CEO from 1999 to 2000 before taking a more permanent position as a Deputy Chairman.

In 2010 he was appointed President of the Industrial Association AIDEPI (Associazione delle Industrie Dolciarie e Pastaie Italiane), established in the same year. From 2010 onwards, he held numerous membership positions until he was appointed, in 2014, Vice-president of the Barilla Center for Food & Nutrition Foundation, a multidisciplinary and independent thinking center that works on food sustainability.
 
Barilla will then be elected in 2016 President of the International Pasta Organization (IPO), a non-profit association dedicated to increasing consumption and awareness of pasta, promoting consumer understanding of the nutritional value and health benefits of this food.
 
From March 2017 to December 2018, he was the Chairman of the Italian Food Association (Unione Italiana Food), and since 1 January 2019, he has taken on the role of Deputy Vice-Chairman, a position in the sign of continuity with the commitments taken to protect the industry, both nationally and internationally.

Since July 2020 he is a member of the Confindustria Executive Council (Consiglio Direttivo).

Racing record

Complete European Formula Two Championship results
(key) (Races in bold indicate pole position; races in italics indicate fastest lap)

Complete International Formula 3000 results
(key) (Races in bold indicate pole position; races in italics indicate fastest lap.)

24 Hours of Le Mans results

Complete Formula One results
(key)

References

External links
Profile on F1 Rejects

1961 births
Paolo
Italian billionaires
Businesspeople from Milan
Italian racing drivers
Italian Formula One drivers
European Formula Two Championship drivers
Japanese Formula 3000 Championship drivers
Italian Formula Three Championship drivers
Living people
Minardi Formula One drivers
24 Hours of Le Mans drivers
24 Hours of Le Mans winning drivers
International Formula 3000 drivers
World Touring Car Championship drivers
World Sportscar Championship drivers
Barilla (company)
24 Hours of Spa drivers
Rally raid truck drivers
Long Distance Series drivers
TOM'S drivers
Team Joest drivers
Japanese Sportscar Championship drivers
Nakajima Racing drivers